Sir Ralph Kilner Brown, OBE, TD, DL (28 August 1909 – 15 June 2003), was a British hurdling athlete, Liberal Party politician and judge.

Background
He was born in Calcutta, the son of Rev. A. E. Brown. He was educated at Kingswood School,  Bishop Vesey's Grammar School and Trinity Hall, Cambridge.

He married, in 1943, Cynthia Rosemary Breffit. They had one son, two daughters and five grandchildren.

Sports career
He was a British 440 yards hurdles champion. At the 1934 Empire Games he won the bronze medal in the 440 yards hurdles event. He missed the 1936 Summer Olympics due to injury. His brother Godfrey and sister Audrey both won medals.

Professional career
In 1934 he was Called to the Bar by Middle Temple and worked at the chambers of Donald Finnemore.

He  was commissioned into the Royal Army Service Corps in March 1939 and served on Field Marshal Montgomery's staff planning the Normandy landings.

In 1954 he was appointed Deputy Chairman of the Warwickshire Quarter Sessions, becoming Chairman ten years later. He served as Recorder of Lincoln from 1960 to 1964 and Recorder of Birmingham from 1964 to 1965.
He was an additional judge at the Old Bailey before becoming Recorder of Liverpool from 1967 to 1969.

He became a High Court judge in 1970 on the Northern Circuit and served until 1985. He was knighted in February 1970 and also appointed a Deputy Lieutenant of Warwickshire.

In 1991 his first book was published Top Brass and No Brass: Inside Story of the Alliance Between Britain and America.

Political career
At Cambridge University he was the runner-up for the Presidency of the Cambridge Union and president of the University Liberal Club, 1931–2. He had become noticed already through his many impassioned speeches as a Young Liberal in opposition to appeasement.

In 1939 he was adopted as Liberal prospective parliamentary candidate for the Stourbridge Division of Worcestershire in succession to his chambers boss Donald Finnemore, but had to wait until after the war ended in 1945 to fight an election. Despite starting in third place, he managed to increase the Liberal share of the vote;

He was President of Birmingham Liberal Organisation, 1946–56. At the 1950 General Election, after boundary changes, Stourbridge was divided with part going into the new Oldbury and Halesowen seat. He fought this new seat for the Liberals. He finished third again.
He was Chairman of the West Midlands Liberal Federation, 1950–56. He was a Member of the Liberal Party National Executive, 1950–56.

In 1959 he was Liberal candidate for the South Buckinghamshire Division. At the General Election he finished third. He continued to play an active part within the Liberal Party at a national level, being a Member of Liberal Party Council. He fought South Buckinghamshire again at the following General Election in 1964 and pushed the Labour candidate into third place. However, this was his last parliamentary contest.

In 1970 he declined an invitation to become a Liberal peer but accepted a knighthood.

References

External links 
 Obituary in The Daily Telegraph, 20. Juni 2003
 Profile at TOPS in athletics
Cripplegate Ward Club: obituary

1909 births
2003 deaths
Military personnel of British India
People educated at Bishop Vesey's Grammar School
Alumni of Trinity Hall, Cambridge
Athletes from Kolkata
Members of the Middle Temple
British sportsperson-politicians
Liberal Party (UK) parliamentary candidates
20th-century English judges
English male hurdlers
Commonwealth Games bronze medallists for England
Commonwealth Games medallists in athletics
Athletes (track and field) at the 1934 British Empire Games
British Army personnel of World War II
Deputy Lieutenants of Warwickshire
Queen's Bench Division judges
Royal Army Service Corps officers
Knights Bachelor
Officers of the Order of the British Empire
Medallists at the 1934 British Empire Games